Miss World America 1979 was the 2nd edition of the Miss World America pageant and it was held in Reichhold Center for the Arts in Charlotte Amalie, U.S. Virgin Islands and was won by Carter Wilson of Virginia. She was crowned by outgoing titleholder, Debra Jean Freeze of North Carolina. Wilson went on to represent the United States at the Miss World 1979 Pageant in London later that year. She finished in the Top 15 at Miss World.

Results

Placements

Special awards

Delegates
The Miss World America 1979 delegates were:

 Alabama - Rene’ Hamilton
 Alaska - Heidi Sue Ruess
 Arizona - Debbie Jo Nix
 Arkansas - Rhonda Cobb
 California - Ramona Henriette Rolle
 Colorado - Cindy Marie Byerly
 Connecticut - Beth Sweeney
 Delaware - Debra Ann Kucher
 Florida -  Eugenia Rywant
 Georgia - Lisa Condrey
 Hawaii - Marie Alohalani Brown
 Idaho - Tannie Ouren
 Illinois - Katherine Ann Kivisto
 Indiana - Lisa Amsbury
 Iowa - Janice Marie Rife
 Kansas - Dine Tapaoan
 Kentucky - Robyn Kay Overby
 Louisiana - Misty Norwood
 Maine - Kim Moxcey
 Maryland - Sheri Clineman
 Massachusetts - Diane Maguire
 Michigan - Cindy Boufford 
 Minnesota - Dawn Carroll La Motte
 Mississippi - Melnee Williams
 Missouri - Sherri Anderson
 Montana - Susan Marie Riplett
 Nebraska - Evelyn Rahm
 Nevada - Gina Hines
 New Hampshire - Darlene Sterbenz
 New Jersey - Angela Hetzel
 New Mexico - Kathleen Callahan
 New York - Shelly Broadwell
 North Carolina - Deborah Ann Fountain
 North Dakota - Machelle Marie Barros
 Ohio - Kathleen King
 Oklahoma - Lesa Jane Sadler
 Oregon - Pam Rowton
 Pennsylvania - Mary Lucina Engel
 Rhode Island - Maureen Mary Whitehouse
 South Carolina - Lynn Boyles
 South Dakota - Sharon Thompson
 Tennessee - Angela Garner
 Texas - Sharri Gorrell
 Utah - Lonni Lynn Jones
 Vermont - Joanne Colbert
 Virginia - Carter Wilson
 Washington - Sydney Louise Smith
 West Virginia - Vicki L. Philips
 Wisconsin - Debbie Riedel
 Wyoming - Kim Morgan

Notes

Withdrawals

Crossovers
Contestants who competed in other beauty pageants:

Miss USA
1976: : Debra Ann Kucher
1978: : Susan Marie Riplett
1985: : Robyn Kay Overby

Miss World America
1980: : Debbie Riedel

References

External links
Miss World Official Website
Miss World America Official Website

1979 in the United States
World America
1979